Drymoea veliterna is a species of moth in the family Geometridae first described by Herbert Druce in 1885. This species can be found in Bolivia.

References

 Ubio
 Global Names Index
 GBIF

Ennominae
Geometridae of South America
Moths described in 1885
Moths of South America